Provvidenti is a comune (municipality) in the Province of Campobasso in the Italian region Molise, located about  northeast of Campobasso.  Provvidenti is the town with the smallest population in the province of Campobasso.

Provvidenti borders the following municipalities: Casacalenda, Morrone del Sannio, Ripabottoni.

Emigration
Since the end of World War II until the late 1960s, the town's population declined considerably due to emigration. The place of choice for many of these emigrants was the Canadian city of Montreal. Montreal even has its own Provvidenti Association.

Borgo della Musica
In 2006 a group of young music-managers and artists, deciding to establish a special place for creativity in the artistic sector, selected Provvidenti as Borgo della Musica ("Village of Music").
 the project is suspended.

References

Cities and towns in Molise